Now We're Cookin may refer to:

Now We're Cookin', a fictitious cooking show in "Weird Al" Yankovic's "Foil (song)"
Now We're Cookin''', a 2021 album by garage rock duo Polish Club
"Now We're Cookin'", a song from the 2022 film Everything Everywhere All at Once''